New Serb Democracy (NSD; officially abbreviated NOVA) is a Serbian nationalist right-wing political party in Montenegro, formed on 24 January 2009 as a merger between Serb People's Party and the People's Socialist Party of Montenegro. Since 2012, it has been a constituent member of the Democratic Front.

History
Envisioned as a broad coalition of pro-Serb parties of Montenegro centred around Serb List coalition of 2006, NOVA was planned to include Democratic Serb Party as well as various Serb cultural and political organisations. However, the merger was more limited, as only the Serb People's Party, People's Socialist Party and "Matica Boke" cultural organisation came to a merger agreement. New Serb Democracy is led by Andrija Mandić, leader of the former Serb People's Party. Mandić sought to transform the Serb List coalition into a more moderate and civic-oriented party, in order to boost the party's coalition potential, and even the dropping the "Serb" prefix from the newly formed party's name was considered. This idea was met with strong resistance during the merger talks. A new party was finally established on 24 January 2009.

As a result of more moderate politics of the new party, a series of the opposition uniting attempts follows. In 2009 parliamentary election New Serb Democracy ran independently and won 9.2% of the votes, and 8 seats. Shortly after the election party enters a big tent and pro-EU A Better Montenegro coalition, which includes the entire parliamentary opposition at the time (NSD, PzP and the SNP). The coalition eventually collapsed after bad results at the 2009-10 municipal elections.

Just before the 2012 parliamentary election, the party re-joins coalition with the PzP, this time as part of the originally-big tent and populist Democratic Front alliance led by moderate politician and former diplomat Miodrag Lekić. At the election, Democratic Front finished second with 22.8% of the votes and 20 seats, out of which NOVA won 8. In 2015, Lekić split from the alliance due to internal disagreements with leadership of constituent parties, having decided to form a new liberal-conservative political party, DEMOS. The party faction led by Vice President Goran Danilović leaves the party and joins Lekić's new party.

During the parliamentary election held in 2016, Democratic Front was again second ranked electoral list with 20,32% of the votes and 18 seats, out of which NOVA again won 8.

On 9 May 2019, party leader Mandić and 13 another people were found guilty by the Higher Court in Montenegro for the "plotting to commit terrorist acts and undermine the constitutional order of Montenegro in an alleged coup d'état  which allegedly took place on the day of 2016 parliamentary election." In February 2021, the appellate court annulled the first instance verdict on all counts of the indictment.

In the 2020 parliamentary election NOVA participated as a member of the "For the Future of Montenegro" coalition. The list went on to win 32.55% of the votes and 27 seats, out of which 9 went to NOVA.

Andrija Mandić, president of New Serb Democracy is that party's and Democratic Front presidential candidate for the upcoming 2023 Montenegrin presidential election.

Ideology
Initially, the party tried to position itself as moderately conservative and centre-right political organization, willingly to compromise with traditionally Montenegrin parties, supporting accession to the European Union and advocating rights for Serb ethnic minority in more democratic and institucional manner, unlike its predecessor, the Serb People's Party.

In recent years, the party has shifted its stances to the right, but still fully supporting accession to the European Union, provided that a referendum be held on this topic. The party is currently the main advocate of Serbian-Montenegrin unionism. NOVA has repeatedly requested a new constitutional amendment so that the national symbols of Montenegro (adopted in 2004) could be changed to represent the entirety of Montenegro. Party also demands that the Serbian language enters the Constitution of Montenegro as the official language.

New Serb Democracy jointly with Democratic People's Party maintains cooperation with largest party in Russia United Russia as well with largest party in Republika Srpska (entity within Bosnia and Herzegovina) Alliance of Independent Social Democrats, the party also maintains a very close cooperation with the largest party in Serbia Serbian Progressive Party and traditionally maintains good relations with the government in Serbia, regardless of the party in charge.

Elections

Parliamentary elections

Presidential elections

References

Political parties established in 2009
2009 establishments in Montenegro
Eastern Orthodox political parties
Serb political parties in Montenegro
Conservative parties in Montenegro
National conservative parties
Serbian nationalism
Right-wing populist parties
Right-wing parties in Europe